Binyon is a surname. Notable people with the surname include:

Claude Binyon (1905–1978), American screenwriter and director
Helen Binyon (1904–1979), British artist and author
Laurence Binyon (1869–1943), English poet, dramatist, and art scholar
T. J. Binyon (1936–2004), English scholar and crime writer